Del Davis (born May 3, 1960 in California) is an American former high jumper and former American record holder.

His mark equaled the U.S. record held by Dwight Stones.

He attended UCLA and graduated with a bachelor of science in Mathematics.

References

1960 births
Living people
American male high jumpers
African-American male track and field athletes
Track and field athletes from California
21st-century African-American people
20th-century African-American sportspeople